Women and Banknotes (German:Frauen und Banknoten) is a 1926 German silent film directed by .

The film's art direction was by Fritz Kraenke.

Cast
In alphabetical order
 Gerd Briese 
 Siegfried Dessauer 
 Angelo Ferrari 
 Louis Ralph 
 Fred Stranz 
 Ruth Weyher 
 Maria Zelenka

References

External links

1926 films
Films of the Weimar Republic
Films directed by Fritz Kaufmann
German silent feature films
German black-and-white films